Berserk, also known in Japan as  is a Japanese anime television series based on Kentaro Miura's manga series of the same name. The series was produced by Nippon Television and VAP, animated by Oriental Light and Magic and directed by Naohito Takahashi. It was broadcast for twenty-five episodes on Nippon TV from October 1997 to April 1998. Berserk was formerly licensed for English release in North America by Media Blasters, who lost the rights to the series in 2012. Berserk has been well-received, with critics praising its storytelling, characters, setting, and soundtrack by Susumu Hirasawa.

Plot

Guts is a lone mercenary warrior who wanders Midland looking for battles, driven solely by his will to survive. After being defeated by Griffith, the ambitious and charismatic leader of a fearsome mercenary group called the Band of the Hawk, Guts becomes a full member of the group. Guts quickly rises through the ranks, becoming Griffith's best warrior. One day, Griffith shows Guts his Behelit, a mysterious demonic relic, and tells him about his dream to rule a kingdom of his own. Three years later, the Band of the Hawk have grown in power and numbers, with Guts serving as a commander of the group. Guts encounters Immortal Zodd, a fearsome giant warrior, who after nearly killing him and Griffith, spares their lives upon seeing Griffith's Behelit, warning Guts of an inescapable death when Griffith's dream dies. While recovering, Griffith starts getting closer to the King of Midland's daughter, Charlotte. At one point, Guts overhears a conversation between Griffith and Charlotte at a royal dinner party, where Griffith says that to him, a true friend is someone who has their own dream. Someone he can call his equal. The Band of the Hawk is eventually hired full-time by the kingdom of Midland, helping to win the Hundred Year War against the Tudor empire. In the meantime, Guts develops a closest relationship with Casca, the Hawks' unit commander and only female member. Some time after the Hawks' victory, Guts decides to leave the group to stop living for Griffith's dream. Griffith challenges Guts to a duel, telling him that he joined the Band of the Hawk because he lost, and that he can only leave the Hawks if he can defeat him. After defeating Griffith with a single swing of his sword, Guts reaffirms his decision and walks away. Psychologically devastated by Guts' departure, Griffith, in a lapse of judgement, has sexual intercourse with Princess Charlotte—unaware that he is being watched. Consequently, Griffith is imprisoned and tortured while the rest of the Hawks are marked for death.

Guts, who spent a year training to become a better swordsman, eventually learns that the Hawks are now outlaws and that Casca has taken over as their leader. Guts goes to their aid, arriving in time as they battle a group of mercenaries. Casca has a plan to rescue Griffith from the Tower of Rebirth, where he is being held. Once they're ready, they go into a dungeon under the Tower of Rebirth, finding Griffith mutilated, disfigured and rendered mute. Back from the escape, the Hawks feel helpless due to Griffith's condition. Casca tells Guts that she must take care of Griffith and that Guts should continue his own path. Overhearing them and desperate at what he has been reduced to, Griffith takes off in a wagon, accidentally crashing into a river nearby. He crawls out of the wreckage, and in despair, attempts to commit suicide by stabbing his throat into a sharp tree root, but fails. Instead, he miraculously finds his Behelit, which he had lost during his time imprisoned, and unintentionally activates it with the blood leaking from his neck. This initiates an event called "the Eclipse", taking everyone present to another plane of existence. The God Hand, a group of archdemons, inform Griffith that he has been chosen as their final member and he must offer his comrades as sacrifices to the "apostles"—humans like Zodd who became powerful demons by sacrificing their loved ones and their own humanity. Griffith agrees and the entire Band of the Hawk are branded as sacrificial offerings. Almost all of the group, except Guts and Casca, are slaughtered and devoured by the apostles. Griffith is reborn as the fifth God Hand member, Femto, and then rapes Casca in front of Guts while the latter is restrained by an apostle that has latched onto his arm. He cuts off his own left forearm and loses his right eye to an apostle in a vain attempt to stop his former friend. In a flashforward, it is shown that Guts ultimately survives the Eclipse, and some time later, becomes known as the Black Swordsman, starting a quest for revenge against the God Hand and the apostles.

Voice cast

Release

Berserk was produced by Nippon Television and VAP, animated by Oriental Light and Magic, and directed by Naohito Takahashi. The series begins with the original manga's Black Swordsman arc, continuing through the Golden Age arc, covering twelve volumes (and part of the thirteenth volume) of the manga. Its twenty-five episodes were broadcast in Japan on Nippon TV from October 8, 1997, to April 1, 1998. VAP collected the episodes on VHS, with thirteen sets released from February 1, 1998, to January 21, 1999. The series was later released on seven DVDs, from April 23 to October 22, 2003. VAP released the series on a Blu-ray box set on January 18, 2012.

In North America, it was originally reported that Urban Vision was negotiating the license to series for English release; however, it was then confirmed that Berserk was licensed by Media Blasters. The English dub was produced by NYAV Post. Around 2002, there were plans to air the series on the Sci-Fi Channel; however, Media Blasters warned them that the violence would require too many cuts. Media Blasters released the series on VHS and six DVDs, under its Anime Works label, from May 28, 2002, to May 27, 2003. A complete DVD collection was released on November 16, 2004, and a remastered edition was released on March 10, 2009. In December 2012, Media Blasters announced that the rights to the series had expired.

In the United Kingdom, Berserk was licensed by MVM Films. The six DVDs were released from September 3, 2007, to July 7, 2008. MVM re-released the series' complete DVD collection on October 11, 2010, and the Blu-ray collection on February 6, 2017. In Australia and New Zealand, Madman Entertainment released the six DVDs between December 2, 2002, and June 18, 2003. The complete DVD collection was released on March 17, 2004, and the Blu-ray collection on February 21, 2018.

Soundtrack

Susumu Hirasawa composed the music for Berserk.  performed the opening theme "Tell Me Why" and Silver Fins performed the ending theme "Waiting so long". "Berserk -Forces-" was released as a single by Nippon Columbia (Teslakite) on November 1, 1997; "Tell Me Why" and "Waiting so long" were released by VAP on November 6, 1997.

 was released by VAP on November 6, 1997.

Track listing
All tracks written and performed by Susumu Hirasawa, except where noted.

Other media
, an art book about the series, was released by Hakusensha on December 9, 1998.

Reception
Berserk has been overall well received by critics. Carlo Ross of THEM Anime Reviews said that, at first, he could not get into the "dreary, depressing tone" of Berserk, but added that as the series progresses, the viewer can meet the cast "as more than just the standard fantasy archetypes", praising the characters for their realistic portraying. He said that Berserks violence was like "a classic Kurosawa film", and that just like his films, Berserks lesson is that "beneath all that metal armor, these soldiers are people." Ross concluded: "If you want fantasy that really makes you think, then don't let the name fool you. Berserk is not about turning your brain off. Not one bit." Brittany Vincent, writing for Anime News Network (ANN), said that Berserk "excels in setting up this tone that defines the story, even if it happens to end abruptly without any real conclusion." Vincent wrote that the adaptation is not perfect and that it has "its share of low-quality animation at times", but that it is "an excellent stab at bringing the story to life." She also noted the omission of characters, like the elf Puck, omission that makes the series a "much more serious and foreboding affair", also stating that the anime has several moments that "speed up time or slow it down considerably." Sandra Scholes of Active Anime wrote: "Berserk is a hard – hitting hack and slash demonically possessed horror fantasy of relentless proportions. There’s a good chance no one has seen this type of anime before or will again. This should be in everyone’s collection."

John Oppliger of AnimeNation said that the most appealing aspect of Berserk is "its ability to present exhilarating, extremely violent action while never losing sight of characterization or the continuing storyline", praising the series as well for its "very complex and unpredictable story." Rob Ghoul of PopCultureShock wrote that at first he was in for "two hours of boredom" at seeing "a generic concept, coupled with typical TV quality production", but that suddenly "a story broke out", adding that Berserk was not the "mundane bloodfest" he originally thought, and called it a "gripping story." Eric Frederiksen, writing for Advanced Media Network, said that it would be easy to call Berserk a "mindlessly violent piece of popcorn-gore", but he said that it is not about a "man with a giant sword slicing through everything in his path", adding that the story and the characters are the real focus of the show, concluding: "Part of what helps Berserk weather the ravages of time better than so many other shows is the sheer volume of stuff it gives us to think about, without shoving it down our throats." Chris Beveridge of AnimeOnDVD wrote: "getting something that is just plain violent – but with a purpose and story – is a real treat and change of pace. Something that doesn’t pull away from the darker side of combat in a fantasy setting […] [I]t’s a series that just grabbed me and made me watch in fascination."

Zac Bertschy, writing for SciFi.com, stated that Berserk is "possibly the most mature, intelligent, and just flat-out kick-butt fantasy series to ever come across the market", adding that the series explores themes like child abuse and schizophrenia, and that it is "a major departure from other common anime fantasy series; it goes where most fear to tread." Bertschy concluded: "If you're a big fantasy fan and like mature, adult stories that aren't afraid to explore even the darkest pits of the psyche, then  is for you." In another review for ANN, Bertschy said that Berserk is the finest example of dark fantasy available on the market and that its original manga basis "surpasses all others in terms of quality and popularity", adding that the series "remains enchanting, entertaining and truly terrifying to this day."

Writing for Anime Jump, Mike Toole said: "Berserk is one of those shows that's just the Total Package-- if you're a fan of action or fantasy and can handle hard-edged, violent stories, it's just what you're looking for." Praising the characters, the "detailed, tightly-wound" plot, and the "furious" battle scenes, concluding: "If there were a such thing as "realistic fantasy," Berserk would be it. Altogether, the show's collective merits make it impossible to ignore—it's truly one of the good ones." Toole, in another review for ANN, called Berserk "a showcase of bad, weird animation", commenting that the distance of time helps to gloss over its issues. In comparing the series to the 2016 series, which was criticized for its handling of CGI, Toole wrote: "It helps that animation mistakes tend to be a bit less noticeable in 2D."

Writing for About.com, Serdar Yegulalp said that Berserk is a "grim but utterly gripping fantasy that makes Lord of the Rings look like Anne of Green Gables", calling its violence "brutal and disturbing", but that it has an "epic storytelling with unforgettable characters." In another review, Yegulalp commented: "Despite its abbreviated, abortive form, and despite a relatively crude animation style, Berserk was, and still is, one of the best anime of its kind", adding that, like Game of Thrones, Berserk "has an appeal far beyond the fantasy-adventure fans who became the show's first and most vocal champions."

Berserks soundtrack has also been praised by critics. Ross said that the opening and ending themes were "two of the least appropriate songs I have ever heard for an anime series", but that Hirasawa's background tracks are "rather memorable", highlighting "Berserk -Forces-", which he called "an object lesson in how to use a synthesizer and reverb completely wrong, and yet still come up with something interesting and fresh anyway", adding that Hirasawa's music is "an acquired taste, to be sure - people either love it or hate it." Bertschy said that the music of Berserk is "certainly worth praising", commenting that the score "leaps effortlessly from haunting and melodic to dark and sinister in the blink of an eye, maintaining credibility and flow throughout." Yegulalp wrote: "[Hirasawa] created the throbbing, disturbing score for the ultra-violent fantasy anime Berserk. Some of the synthesizer and sampler techniques used sound a bit primitive today, but they're more than made up for by the haunting composition and songwriting. If the alternately joyful and sorrowful "Guts's Theme" doesn't send chills through you, there's probably not much that could." Writing for Funimation, Kathleen Townsend highlighted "Gut's Theme", and stated: "It’s particularly gentle for a world filled with evil and a fearsome protagonist willing to carve his own limbs away if it means helping those he loves. It’s peaceful and delicate, filled with hope and longing." Toole said that Berserks music has"both ups and downs." On the upside, he lauded the incidental music, stating that the music is "churning and intense, and lends a well-placed sense of urgency to the show's plot", but Toole commented that the selection of compositions "is pretty small, which means that a lot of themes, especially "Forces," are used and reused incessantly. It's a good soundtrack, and an unusual one, but it gets a bit repetitive." In another review, Toole said that Hirasawa's "churning, hypnotic" musical output was "as sort of like tossing Philip Glass, Yello, and Peter Gabriel into a centrifuge." Toole highlighted "Berserk -Forces-", and said that it has become "iconic and wholly associated with the series." Toole concluded: "I appreciate Berserks excellent direction and pacing and dig its atmospheric artwork, especially Kobayashi Production's awesome painting work, but it's the music that has aged the best." Friederickson wrote that Hirasawa's synth-heavy soundtrack "brings an otherworldly feeling that reminds of some of those great practical-effects-fueled '80s movies. It fits perfectly into this story where magic is beginning to emerge in a world where no one believes in it."

Notes

References

Further reading

External links

  
 

1997 anime television series debuts
1998 Japanese television series endings
Japanese adult animated adventure television series
Japanese adult animated fantasy television series
Anime series based on manga
Anime Works
 
Dark fantasy anime and manga
High fantasy anime and manga
Madman Entertainment anime
Nippon TV original programming
OLM, Inc.
Rape in television
Sword and sorcery anime and manga

ja:剣風伝奇ベルセルク